Ewa Larysa Krause (4 January 1975 – 12 January 1997) was a Polish judoka. She competed in the women's half-lightweight event at the 1996 Summer Olympics.

References

External links
 

1975 births
1997 deaths
Polish female judoka
Olympic judoka of Poland
Judoka at the 1996 Summer Olympics
People from Koszalin
20th-century Polish women